The Garfield Public Schools is a comprehensive community public school district that serves students in pre-Kindergarten through twelfth grade from Garfield, in Bergen County, New Jersey, United States. The district is one of 31 former Abbott districts statewide that were established pursuant to the decision by the New Jersey Supreme Court in Abbott v. Burke which are now referred to as "SDA Districts" based on the requirement for the state to cover all costs for school building and renovation projects in these districts under the supervision of the New Jersey Schools Development Authority.

As of the 2020–21 school year, the district, comprised of 12 schools, had an enrollment of 4,713 students and 438.1 classroom teachers (on an FTE basis), for a student–teacher ratio of 10.8:1.

The district is classified by the New Jersey Department of Education as being in District Factor Group "B", the second-lowest of eight groupings. District Factor Groups organize districts statewide to allow comparison by common socioeconomic characteristics of the local districts. From lowest socioeconomic status to highest, the categories are A, B, CD, DE, FG, GH, I and J.

Schools
Schools in the district (with 2020–21 enrollment data from the National Center for Education Statistics) are:

Preschool
Garfield Early Childhood Learning Center (178 students; in PreK)
Garfield Public Preschool Annex (95; PreK)
Garfield Public Preschool Annex 3 (159; PreK)
Elementary schools
Washington Irving School #4 (382; K-5)
Woodrow Wilson School #5 (280; K-5)
Abraham Lincoln Elementary School #6 (365; PreK-5)
Theodore Roosevelt School #7 (273; K-5)
Christopher Columbus School #8 (306; K-5)
Thomas Jefferson School #9 (295; K-5)
James Madison School #10 (245; K-5)
Middle school
Garfield Middle School (989; 6-8)
High school
Garfield High School (1,159; 9-12)

Administration
Core members of the district's administration are:
Anna Sciacca, Superintendent
Dr. Giovanni Cusmano, Business Administrator / Board Secretary

Board of education
The district's board of education, comprised of nine members, sets policy and oversees the fiscal and educational operation of the district through its administration. As a Type II school district, the board's trustees are elected directly by voters to serve three-year terms of office on a staggered basis, with three seats up for election each year that have been held as part of the November general election since 2021. The board appoints a superintendent to oversee the district's day-to-day operations and a business administrator to supervise the business functions of the district. 

Until 2020, Garfield had been one of the 13 districts statewide (five of which are in Bergen County) which held school elections in April and in which voters also decided on passage of the annual school budget. In June 2020, the city council voted to shift school elections from April to November, with the first election under the new calendar to take place in 2021; this change will also mean that voters no longer vote on the school budget, as long as spending increases are within the state-mandated threshold.

References

External links
Garfield Public Schools

School Data for the Garfield Public Schools, National Center for Education Statistics

Garfield, New Jersey
New Jersey Abbott Districts
New Jersey District Factor Group B
School districts in Bergen County, New Jersey